Alain Duprat (born 4 April 1939) is a French rower. He competed in the men's eight event at the 1984 Summer Olympics.

References

External links
 
 

1939 births
Living people
French male rowers
Olympic rowers of France
Rowers at the 1984 Summer Olympics
Place of birth missing (living people)